Bjørn Skogmo (born 12 December 1940) is a Norwegian diplomat.

He was born in Namsos, and is a cand.polit. by education. He started working for the Norwegian Ministry of Foreign Affairs in 1969. He served as the Norwegian ambassador to the United Nations in Geneva from 1994 to 2002, assisting permanent under-secretary of state in the Ministry of Foreign Affairs from 2002 to 2005 and Norwegian ambassador to France from 2005 to 2009.

References

1940 births
Living people
Norwegian civil servants
Ambassadors of Norway to France
People from Namsos
Permanent Representatives of Norway to the United Nations